Tunga is a genus of fleas belonging to the family Hectopsyllidae.

The genus has almost cosmopolitan distribution.

Species:
 Tunga bondari Wagner, 1932 
 Tunga caecata (Enderlein, 1901) 
 Tunga penetrans Linnaeus, 1758

References

Fleas
Siphonaptera genera